To the Four Winds (Spanish:A los cuatro vientos) is a 1955 Mexican musical film directed by Adolfo Fernández Bustamante and starring Rosita Quintana, Miguel Aceves Mejía and Joaquín Pardavé.

The film's art direction was by Gunther Gerzso.

Cast
 Rosita Quintana as Paloma Vargas  
 Miguel Aceves Mejía as Pablo Gálvez  
 Joaquín Pardavé as Don Manuel, padrino  
 Alberto Catalá as Empleado teatro  
 Eduardo Alcaraz as Modisto  
 Carlos Riquelme as Doctor  
 Guillermo Álvarez Bianchi
 María Valdealde as  camerino de Paloma  
 Patricia de Morelos as Acompañante celosa de Emilio 
 Eva Calvo as Amante de Pablo  
 Norma Ancira as Luz, cantante  
 René Cardona as Don Emilio

References

Bibliography 
 María Luisa Amador. Cartelera cinematográfica, 1950-1959. UNAM, 1985.

External links 
 

1955 films
1955 musical films
Mexican musical films
1950s Spanish-language films
Films directed by Adolfo Fernández Bustamante
Mexican black-and-white films
1950s Mexican films